The 1907–08 Isthmian League season was the third in the history of the Isthmian League, an English football competition.

At the end of the previous season Casuals, Civil Service and Ealing Association resigned from the league. Dulwich Hamlet, Oxford City and West Norwood joined the league. London Caledonians won the title for a second time in three years.

League table

References

External links
Official website

Isthmian League seasons
1907–08 in English association football leagues